Denis Leproux (born 16 December 1964) is a French former racing cyclist. He rode in the 1998 Tour de France, where he finished 39th overall.

Major results
1986
 3rd Overall Tour du Limousin
1st Stage 1
1987
 3rd Polymultipliée
 4th Overall Circuit Cycliste Sarthe
1988
 7th GP de la Ville de Rennes
1992
 1st Overall Tour de l'Ain
1997
 1st Overall Ronde de l'Isard
 2nd Overall Circuit des Mines
1999
 6th Tour du Doubs
 9th Overall Tour de Pologne
2000
 1st Stage 4 Tour de l'Ain

References

1964 births
Living people
French male cyclists